Geocoris punctipes, the big-eye bug, is a species of big-eyed bug in the family Geocoridae. It is found in the Caribbean, Central America, North America, Oceania, and South America.

References

External links

 

Lygaeoidea
Hemiptera of South America
Hemiptera of Central America
Hemiptera of North America
Hemiptera of Oceania
Insects described in 1832
Taxa named by Thomas Say
Articles created by Qbugbot